Anke Borowikow (born ) is a German female volleyball player. She was part of the Germany women's national volleyball team.

She participated in the 2009 FIVB Volleyball World Grand Prix.
On club level she played for 1. VC Wiesbaden in 2009.

References

External links
 Profile at FIVB.org

1986 births
Living people
German women's volleyball players
Place of birth missing (living people)